

This is a list of the National Register of Historic Places listings in Anderson County, Tennessee.

This is intended to be a complete list of the properties and districts on the National Register of Historic Places in Anderson County, Tennessee, United States. Latitude and longitude coordinates are provided for many National Register properties and districts; these locations may be seen together in a map.

There are 19 properties and districts in the county that are listed on the National Register, and one former listing.
	
See also National Register of Historic Places listings in Roane County, Tennessee for additional properties in Oak Ridge and Oliver Springs, cities that span the county line.

Current listings

|}

Former listings

|}

See also

List of National Historic Landmarks in Tennessee
National Register of Historic Places listings in Tennessee

References

 
Anderson
Buildings and structures in Anderson County, Tennessee